Scotts Run is a  long 2nd order tributary to Big Sandy Creek in Fayette County, Pennsylvania, United States.

Course
Scotts Run rises about 1 mile southwest of Mt. Washington, and then flows southwest to join Big Sandy Creek about 3 miles north-northeast of Elliottsville.

Watershed
Scotts Run drains  of area, receives about 50.8 in/year of precipitation, has a wetness index of 302.71, and is about 96% forested.

See also
List of rivers of Pennsylvania

References

Rivers of Pennsylvania
Rivers of Fayette County, Pennsylvania